Rick Pate is an American politician serving as the 30th Commissioner of Agriculture and Industries in Alabama. He previously served as mayor of Lowndesboro, Alabama from 2004 until his election as Commissioner of Agriculture and Industries in January 2019. He also served as chair of the Lowndes County Republican Party. 

Pate graduated from Auburn University School of Agriculture in 1978. He is married to Julie Dismukes and they have two children.

Electoral history
Pate finished first in the Republican Primary in June 2018 and then won the runoff for Agriculture Commissioner of Alabama. In November 2018, he was unopposed in the general election receiving more than 97% of the vote and began his term of office on January 14, 2019

References

1955 births
2020 United States presidential electors
21st-century American politicians
Alabama Commissioners of Agriculture and Industries
Alabama Republicans
Auburn University alumni
Living people
Mayors of places in Alabama
People from Lowndes County, Alabama